Momzillas (stylized as MomZillas) is a 2013 Filipino comedy film directed by Wenn V. Deramas and produced by Star Cinema and Viva Films. It stars Maricel Soriano, Eugene Domingo, Billy Crawford, and Andi Eigenmann, and is part of Star Cinema's 20th anniversary presentation.

Cast
Maricel Soriano as Clara del Valle
Eugene Domingo as Minerva Capistrano
Billy Crawford as Elwood del Valle
Andi Eigenmann as Rina Capistrano – del Valle
Candy Pangilinan as Gracia
Divina Valencia as Lola Maria
Luz Valdez as Lola Juanita
Mel Martinez as Liio
Atak as Wedding Priest
Eagle Riggs as a Wedding Coordinator
Joey Paras as Brunette
Charles Yulo
Paul Jake Castillo
Karen Dematera as Karen
Tess Antonio as a Wedding Coordinator 
Vince de Jesus
Eri Neeman as Police
Jeff Luna as Jimboy
Cristine Reyes 
Christian Vasquez as Love of Minerva and Clara
 Marc Solis as Kidnapper
Andrea Brillantes as Young Rina
Calvin Joseph Gomez as Young Elwood
Jason Francisco as Fisherman

References

External links

2013 films
Star Cinema films
Viva Films films
Philippine comedy films
Films directed by Wenn V. Deramas